Legyi may refer to several places in Burma:

Legyi, Kale
Legyi, Myinmu
Legyi, Mogok, in Mogok Township